Geoffrey Bwalya Mwamba (born 15 March 1959) is a Zambian businessman and politician who served as Member of Parliament for Kasama Central from 2009 to 2016. He later served as Vice President of the United Party for National Development. Under the Patriotic Front government of President Michael Sata, he served as Minister of Defence from 2011 to 2013.

Mwamba was expelled from the ruling PF in February 2014. On 23 July 2015, he endorsed the main opposition party, the United Party for National Development (UPND). On 3 June 2016, he was selected to stand as the running mate of UPND candidate Hakainde Hichilema in the August 2016 presidential election. However, he unceremoniously left the United Party for National Development and returned to the Patriotic Front party in 2019.

References

Defence Ministers of Zambia
Living people
Members of the National Assembly of Zambia
United Party for National Development politicians
Patriotic Front (Zambia) politicians
1959 births